Grimm's Spiel und Holz Design is toy manufacturer located in Hochdorf, Southern Germany. Grimm's produces primarily wooden toys including puzzles, building blocks, baby rattles and stackers, doll houses and dollhouse furniture, stacking rainbows of many sizes, mobiles, decorative items, roll-along animals, vehicles, and more. In 2013, Grimm's began producing their own line of Waldorf dolls. These dolls are a natural progression of their product line, which is inspired by Waldorf education (in Europe, commonly referred to as Steiner education).

Grimm's Spiel und Holz Design (sometimes referred to as "Grimm's" or "Grimm's Spiel & Holz") was founded in 1978, at which time it was called Spiel und Holz Design. In 2006, the company came under new ownership, at which time the name was changed to Grimm's Spiel und Holz Design.

The wood used for Grimm's production is sourced from sustainably managed forests in Europe and includes alder, lime, beech and maple. The wood is cut into the forms then coated with natural oil. If the product is colored, the wood is then stain with certified non toxic, water-based colors.

Grimm's products are available worldwide. They are sold in independent and boutique toy stores, as well as several sources online, including Amazon.

References

External links 
 Grimm's Spiel und Holz Design website—

Toy companies of Germany
Design companies established in 1978
Manufacturing companies established in 1978
1978 establishments in West Germany
Toy companies established in 1978 
German companies established in 1978